Joseph Dollard Herve St. Laurent (May 12, 1929 – April 6, 2015) was a Canadian ice hockey defenceman.

Dollard started his National Hockey League career with the Montreal Canadiens in 1951.  He would spend eight years in Montreal before being traded to the Chicago Black Hawks.  He won four Stanley Cups with Montreal and one with Chicago.

He started out with the Jr. Canadiens of the QJHL where he skated for two seasons from 1947 to 1949. There he demonstrated an offensive touch and an ability to play a tough game of defence at the other end of the ice.  In 1949–50, St. Laurent started a three-year relationship with the Royal Montreal Hockey Club of the QSHL. He spent most of his time sharpening the finer points of his game while putting them to the occasional test by joining the Habs for a couple of stints.

Around 1952–53, however, the Canadiens began to introduce significant new blood in the form of Jacques Plante and Dickie Moore among others. Dollard helped Montreal win the Stanley Cup in 1953. One of the others included St. Laurent who settled onto the Habs' blueline corps as a stay-at-home regular for the next six seasons. His efforts contributed to three straight Stanley Cup victories between 1956, 1957, 1958.

After the third championship, St. Laurent was sold to the Chicago Black Hawks who were gradually assembling a lineup bent on bringing the Cup to town after a lengthy absence. In 1960–61, the team finally ended the championship drought by ousting the Red Wings in the finals.

St. Laurent played for the Hawks until the end of the 1961–62 campaign. The following year, he was dispatched to the Quebec Aces of the AHL, during which St. Laurent took a hard fall to the ice, breaking his leg and ending his aspirations to make it back to the NHL. At the end of the season, he announced his retirement.

On May 17, 1952, he was married to Jessie FitzPatrick (1929-1993).

St. Laurent died on April 6, 2015, aged 85.

Career statistics

References

External links
 

1929 births
2015 deaths
Canadian ice hockey defencemen
Chicago Blackhawks players
Montreal Canadiens players
People from Verdun, Quebec
Stanley Cup champions
Ice hockey people from Montreal